Thyssen Henschel was a German industrial firm and defense contractor.

One part of the company  Henschel Wehrtechnik was acquired by Rheinmetall in 1999 and was integrated into Rheinmetall Landsysteme GmbH in 2000.

Products

 TAM medium tank for Argentine Army
 Sedena-Henschel HWK-11 - infantry fighting vehicle for Mexican Army
 TM-170 APC
 Marder infantry fighting vehicle
 Sri Lanka Railways M6

See also
Henschel & Son
ThyssenKrupp
Rheinmetall
:Category:Henschel locomotives
TH-495, 1990s unbuilt light combat vehicle

References

External links

Defence companies of Germany
Thyssen AG
Defunct locomotive manufacturers of Germany